Sévaré (or Sevare) is a town in the Mopti Region of Mali. From Sévaré one can access Bandiagara to the east, Gao and Timbuktu to the north, Segou and Bamako to the southwest and Burkina Faso to the south.

Mopti Airport is near Sévaré, which lies within the boundaries of Mopti Commune.

Said to have been founded by a Fula hunter, Se Waware, its importance began to grow with the construction of roads and the dike to Mopti under French colonial rule.

Climate

References
Reference was made to the article on Sévaré in the French Wikipedia

Populated places in Mopti Region